Schistura nandingensis is a species of ray-finned fish, a stone loach in the genus Schistura from the Nanding River drainage in Yunxian County, Yunnan.

References

N
Fish described in 1985